Rotohiko Tangonui Haupapa  ( 1836 – 1 August 1887) was a notable New Zealand tribal leader, administrator and educationalist. Of Māori descent, he identified with the Ngāti Whakaue iwi. He was born in Ohinemutu, Rotorua, New Zealand in about 1836.

References

1836 births
1887 deaths
People from Rotorua
New Zealand Māori schoolteachers
New Zealand educators
Ngāti Whakaue people